António Ferreira may refer to:
 António Ferreira (poet)
 António Ferreira (filmmaker)
 António Ferreira (sport shooter)
 Antônio Ferreira (hurdler)